Villanova station may refer to:
Villanova station (Norristown High Speed Line)
Villanova station (SEPTA Regional Rail)